The timberman beetle (Acanthocinus aedilis) is a species of woodboring beetle belonging to the longhorn beetle family.

It is found in woodlands, with a large distribution through Europe, Russia and Central Asia. It is also known as the Siberian Timberman due to its range extending northwards in to Siberia. In Finnish this species is known as Sarvijaakko, in Dutch as Dennenboktor and in Swedish as Större Timmerman. For more vernacular names see the GBIF profile. Despite a few sources suggesting reports in Central America, no confirmed reports were available at time of editing (May, 2020). The species is also not listed as invasive in North America.

The body length ranges from 12-20mm, with antennae up for 3 times the body length in males, or 1.5 times the body length in females. Their lifespan is up to 3 years which includes the 1–2 years spent in the larval stage.

This species is capable of surviving freezing temperatures below -37 °C in both the adult and larval stages. The adults are active from March to June, during which they are diurnal. The adults overwinter in pupal chambers in leaf litter or under the bark.

In Continental Europe, this species has become a serious pest of commercially-grown timber as the larvae feed under the bark, weakening the trees. Through infesting weakened trees, excavating galleries under the bark, the trees then die. Their development within wood debris in natural forests is beneficial for nutrient cycling in forest ecosystems, but can also facilitate the transfer of pathogenic fungi within woodlands. Scots pine (Pinus sylvestris L.) and Norway Spruce (Picea abies) are key food sources for this beetle species.

A distribution map within the UK can be found courtesy of the National Biodiversity Network. The species is reported to be Nationally Scarce category B within Great Britain by the Wildlife Trust BCN in 2018.

References

Insect Natural History, A.D.Imms, Collins, 1973

Acanthocinus
Beetles of Europe
Beetles of Asia
Beetles described in 1758
Taxa named by Carl Linnaeus